The Skybus Metro was a prototype suspended railway system by Indian technologist B. Rajaram with the Konkan Railway. The system consisted of an elevated track with the cars suspended below, similar to the Wuppertal Schwebebahn or H-Bahn systems in Germany.

A 1.6 km (1 mi) test track in Margao, Goa started trials in 2004, but on 25 September, one employee was killed and three injured in an accident, ending the trial. The test track was supposed to be extended to 10.5 km, but no progress was made after the accident. In 2013, the Konkan Railway dismantled the line.

Construction
Skybus can run at 100 km/h using electric power, with suspended cars that carry the passengers.

Tracks

Heavy  rails of standard gauge are placed in 8m x 2m-box enclosures.  These rails are supported over 1m diameter columns 10m tall, spaced at 15-20m intervals on pile foundation. This structure is constructed in the divider space between road lanes. Sky Bus follows existing road routes without disturbing traffic. The steepest gradient was 2%. The sharpest curve had a radius of 100m. The maximum radius of vertical curve was 3375m.

Bogies
Two standard axle "bogies" provide the drive mechanism. Each bogie is driven by 3-phase alternating current (AC) motor. A third rail provides power. Braking is either regenerative (returning electricity to the grid) with supplemental disc and (emergency) mechanical braking. Power is delivered to the vehicles using brushes or by current carrying wheels.

Coaches
The coaches are double walled lightweight shells with wide larger windows & are suspended below the rails. The air conditioned coaches have 4m-wide automatic doors. They offer audiovisual information to passengers. Each pair of coaches carries 300 passengers. Each coach is 9.25m long and 3.2 m wide. "Trains" consist of two coaches, with total length of 18.5m.

Traverser
The traverser automatically shifts units between tracks. The traverser is a modified form of transverser used in others industries for lifting & shifting objects. In the traverser a platform of track is hung to a bogie which consist of a motor & is also mounted on the track. The traverser acts like a station. A distance of 50m from the last station to the traverser is maintained to provide holding capacity for two units as a third unit is getting traversed in case of unforeseen delay.

Station
The station is an air-conditioned platform 5.5m above ground. Stations have automatic doors and lifts. A smart card opens the station door. The station fits in a 50m long spot.

Trials
In 2004 the Konkan Railway carried out a trial of Sky Bus in Margao, Goa with the help of Goa state government. On 25 September, one employee was killed and three injured in an accident when the coaches hit the concrete track pillars, ending the trial.

Managing director Bhanu Prakash Tayal shared that KRC was unable to engineer critical components like the "swing arrestor" and "switching apparatus" which could have potentially addressed the safety concerns that surrounded the project since the 2004 accident.

Rajaram defended Sky Bus, stating that the accident was avoidable.

Closure
In October, 2013 the Konkan Railway Corporation (KRC) decided to discontinue the SkyBus project to curb expenses. The 1.6km test track was dismantled as a result of the decision. The KRC had solicited interest from foreign firms to maintain and upgrade the test track; this was met with poor response which also contributed to the decision to dismantle.

Future

As per new plan of State government of Goa they are planning for revival of Skybus metro on 1.6+10.5kms length with North-South Metro which will connect both district of Goa.

See also

 Bennie Railplane
 H-Bahn
 List of monorail systems
 Memphis Suspension Railway
 Mumbai Monorail
 Rail transport in India
 Schwebebahn Dresden
 Transport in India
 Wuppertal Schwebebahn

References

External links

 Skybus page from konkanrailway.com
 Konkan Railways Skybus page (PDF)
 Indian Railways Fan Club: Konkan Railway Skybus Metro
 B. Rajaram, designer of the Skybus Metro
 Suspended coach transportation system. Patent US 6688235 B2.

Transport in Margao
Buildings and structures in Margao
Konkan Railway
Monorails in India
Suspended monorails